Union-Prilly railway station is a railway station in the municipality of Prilly, in the Swiss canton of Vaud.

Services 
 the following services stop at Union-Prilly:

References

External links 
 
 

Railway stations in the canton of Vaud
Lausanne–Echallens–Bercher Railway stations